Ghaffar Farzadi is an Iranian mathematician at University of Tabriz. Farzadi is senior member of the Freedom Movement of Iran, a member of its central council, as well as head of its regional branch in Azerbaijan. He has been detained several times for his political activities.

Farzadi was an active member of the Islamic Association of Students in India during the 1970s.

He enrolled as a candidate for the parliamentary seat for Tabriz, Osku and Azarshahr in the 2016 election, however the Guardian Council disqualified him.

References

Living people
1946 births
20th-century Iranian mathematicians
Aligarh Muslim University alumni
Academic staff of the University of Tabriz
Freedom Movement of Iran politicians
Members of the Association for Defense of Freedom and the Sovereignty of the Iranian Nation